Sosnówka  is a village in the administrative district of Gmina Twardogóra, within Oleśnica County, Lower Silesian Voivodeship, in south-western Poland. Prior to 1945, it was in Germany.

The village has a population of 150.

External links
Sosnówka on Gmina Twardogóra website

References

Villages in Oleśnica County